Xuanwumen Station may refer to:

 Xuanwumen Station (Beijing) (宣武门站), a station on Lines 2 and 4 of the Beijing Subway
 Xuanwumen Station (Nanjing) (玄武门站), a station on Line 1 of the Nanjing Metro

See also
Xuanwumen (disambiguation)